Buying in may refer to:

Buying in (poker), a tournament entrance fee
Buying in (securities), a process in which a buyer whose seller fails to deliver the securities contracted for, can "buy in" the securities from a third party
Management buy-in, when an outside management becomes a company's new management by buying it